The Wendy Barrie Show (also known as Inside Photoplay, Photoplay Time, Through Wendy's Window, and Who's Who With Wendy Barrie) is an American talk show hosted by Wendy Barrie, which aired from November 10, 1948, to September 27, 1950.

Broadcast history
The Wendy Barrie Show is notable as one of the first examples of a televised talk show.  It aired separately on ABC, DuMont, and NBC, debuting on ABC on November 10, 1948 (Wednesday) at 8:30 pm ET as the sketch comedy Inside Photoplay before switching to Mondays in September–December 1949 as Photoplay Time, then becoming Through Wendy's Window in August–September 1950  The DuMont version aired from 2:30 to 3:00 pm ET from January 17, 1949 (Monday), to July 13, 1949 (Wednesday).  The NBC version aired Tuesdays and Thursdays, with the final episode airing on September 27, 1950.

The series stars Wendy Barrie, a film and television actress with over 40 films to her credit.

According to the book What Women Watched: Daytime Television in the 1950s (University of Texas Press, 2005) by Marsha Cassidy, the DuMont daytime schedule beginning in January 1949 was:

10-10:30am Johnny Olson's Rumpus Room
10:30-11am  Welcome, Neighbors
11am-12noon  The Stan Shaw Show
12noon-12:15pm   Amanda
12:15-12:30pm  Man in the Street
12:30-12:45pm  Camera Headlines
12:45-1pm   Fashions in Song
1-1:30pm   Okay, Mother
2:30-3pm  Inside Photoplay (The Wendy Barrie Show)
3-3:15pm  The Needle Shop
3:15-3:30pm  Vincent Lopez Speaking (The Vincent Lopez Show)

Tri-State Network
In 1953, three television stations owned by Taft Broadcasting Company and Cox Communications formed the short-lived "Tri-State Network" to compete with entertainment programming produced by Crosley Broadcasting Corporation on Crosley television stations in the Cincinnati, Columbus, and Dayton, Ohio broadcast markets. On January 11, 1954, a new The Wendy Barrie Show premiered from the studios of WHIO-TV in Dayton, simulcast on Taft Broadcasting's WKRC-TV in Cincinnati and WTVN-TV (now WSYX) in Columbus.  Wendy Barrie's contract was terminated in October, 1954.

Episode status
A DuMont episode survives on YouTube under the title The Wendy Barrie Show, and featuring guest Jack Shaindlin.

One DuMont episode from June 1949, under the title Who's Who With Wendy Barrie, is held in the J. Fred MacDonald collection at the Library of Congress.

An episode from the ABC run, dated October 17, 1949, and titled Photoplay Time, is in the collection of the UCLA Film and Television Archive.

See also
The Adventures of Oky Doky (1948-1949 on DuMont)
Picture This (1948-1949 on NBC)
List of programs broadcast by the DuMont Television Network
List of surviving DuMont Television Network broadcasts
1949-50 United States network television schedule

References

Bibliography
David Weinstein, The Forgotten Network: DuMont and the Birth of American Television (Philadelphia: Temple University Press, 2004) 
Alex McNeil, Total Television, Fourth edition (New York: Penguin Books, 1980) 
Tim Brooks and Earle Marsh, The Complete Directory to Prime Time Network TV Shows, Third edition (New York: Ballantine Books, 1964)

External links
 
 DuMont historical website, see Inside Photoplay entry 
 The Wendy Barrie Show on YouTube with guest Jack Shaindlin
 Part Two of The Wendy Barrie Show with Shaindlin on YouTube
 Part Three of The Wendy Barrie Show with Shaindlin on YouTube
 Part Four of The Wendy Barrie Show with Shaindlin on YouTube

1948 American television series debuts
1950 American television series endings
American Broadcasting Company original programming
American television talk shows
Black-and-white American television shows
DuMont Television Network original programming
English-language television shows
NBC original programming